The Best of Ill Niño is a compilation album released by Roadrunner Records on September 12, 2006. The album features material from the band's first 3 studio albums released with the label (as such, material from the Ill Niño EP wasn't included). The record was released without Ill Niño's involvement (they were by that time, signed to Cement Shoes Records)

The album was released simultaneously with similarly unsanctioned best-of collections of the bands Sepultura, Fear Factory and Type O Negative.

Track listing

Tracks 1-5 are from the album Revolution Revolución.
Tracks 6-9 are from the album Confession.
Tracks 10-13 are from the album One Nation Underground.

Personnel 
Cristian Machado – vocals
Jardel Martins Paisante – guitar
Marc Rizzo – guitar on tracks 1-7
Ahrue Luster – guitar on tracks 8-13
Lazaro Pina – bass
Dave Chavarri – drums
Roger Vasquez – percussion on tracks 1-5
Daniel Couto – percussion on tracks 6-13
Omar Clavijo - keyboards
Eddie Wohl

References

Ill Niño albums
2006 greatest hits albums
Roadrunner Records compilation albums
Albums produced by Eddie Wohl